The 2003–04 Mestis season was the fourth season of the Mestis, the second level of ice hockey in Finland. 12 teams participated in the league, and KalPa won the championship.

Standings

Playoffs

Qualification

Ahmat were relegated to Suomi-sarja.

External links
 Season on hockeyarchives.info

Fin
2003–04 in Finnish ice hockey
Mestis seasons